Brosseau Station or Brosseau is a former village and former railway station in the present city of Brossard, Quebec, Canada.

1953 house fire
A fire in December 1953 killed three children.

1956 railway accident
Two railway workers were killed in a train wreck in Brosseau in 1956.

References

Fiche descriptive.  Commission de toponymie du Québec.
 Natural Resources Canada. Geographical Names. Brosseau.
 En Cour de Police, La Patrie,  November 22, 1948

External links
Quartier Brosseau website
Photograph of Brosseau railway station circa 1945

Transport in Brossard
Railway stations in Montérégie
Disused railway stations in Canada
Communities in Montérégie